Carposina is a genus of moths in the Carposinidae family.

Species
Carposina achroana Meyrick, 1883
Carposina altivaga Meyrick, 1925
Carposina apousia Clarke, 1971
Carposina asbolopis Meyrick, 1928
Carposina askoldana Diakonoff, 1989
Carposina atlanticella Rebel, 1894
Carposina atronotata Walsingham, 1907
Carposina autologa Meyrick, 1910
Carposina benigna Meyrick, 1913
Carposina berberidella Herrich-Schäffer, 1855
Carposina bicincta Walsingham, 1907
Carposina biloba Davis, 1969
Carposina brachycentra Meyrick, 1914
Carposina bullata Meyrick, 1913
Carposina candace Meyrick, 1932
Carposina capnarcha (Meyrick, 1938) (originally in Meridarchis)
Carposina carcinopa Meyrick, 1927
Carposina cardinata (Meyrick, 1913) (originally in Trepsitypa)
Carposina cervinella Walsingham, 1907
Carposina chaetolopha Turner, 1926
Carposina chersodes Meyrick, 1915
Carposina conobathra Meyrick, 1928
Carposina coreana Kim, 1955
=Carposina cornusvora (Yang, 1982) (originally in Asiacarposina)
Carposina corticella Walsingham, 1907
=Carposina latifasciata Walsingham, 1907
=Carposina semitogata Walsingham, 1907
Carposina cretata Davis, 1969
Carposina crinifera Walsingham, 1907
Carposina crypsichola Meyrick, 1910
Carposina dascioptera Turner, 1947
Carposina diampyx Diakonoff, 1989
Carposina dispar Walsingham, 1907
Carposina distincta Walsingham, 1907
Carposina divaricata Walsingham, 1907
Carposina dominicae Davis, 1969
Carposina ekbatana Amsel, 1978
Carposina engalactis Meyrick, 1932
Carposina euphanes Bradley, 1956
Carposina euschema Bradley, 1965
Carposina exsanguis Meyrick, 1918
Carposina fernaldana Busck, 1907
Carposina ferruginea Walsingham, 1907
Carposina gemmata Walsingham, 1907
Carposina gigantella Rebel, 1917
Carposina glauca Meyrick, 1913
Carposina gracillima Walsingham, 1907
Carposina graminicolor Walsingham, 1907
Carposina graminis Walsingham, 1907
Carposina herbarum Walsingham, 1907
Carposina hercotis Meyrick, 1913
Carposina hyperlopha Turner, 1947
=Carposina poliosticha Turner, 1947
Carposina impavida Meyrick, 1913
Carposina inscripta Walsingham, 1907
Carposina irata Meyrick, 1914
Carposina irrorata Walsingham, 1907
Carposina lacerata Meyrick, 1913
Carposina latebrosa Meyrick, 1910
Carposina lembula (Meyrick, 1910) (originally in Meridarchis)
=Carposina hylactica (Meyrick, 1938) (originally in Meridarchis)
Carposina leptoneura Meyrick, 1920
Carposina longipalpalis Mey, 2007
Carposina loxolopha Turner, 1947
Carposina maritima Ponomarenko, 1999
Carposina mauii Walsingham, 1907
Carposina mediella Walker, 1866 (originally in Enopa)
=Carposina ceramophanes Turner, 1947
=Carposina pterocosmana Meyrick, 1881
Carposina megalosema Diakonoff, 1949
Carposina mesophaea Bradley, 1965
Carposina mesospila Meyrick, 1920
Carposina mimodes Meyrick, 1910
Carposina mnia Diakonoff, 1954
Carposina nereitis Meyrick, 1913
Carposina nesolocha Meyrick, 1910
Carposina neurophorella Meyrick, 1879
Carposina nigromaculata Walsingham, 1907
Carposina nigronotata Walsingham, 1907
Carposina olbiodora Turner, 1947
Carposina olivaceonitens Walsingham, 1907
Carposina orphania Meyrick, 1910
Carposina paracrinifera Clarke, 1971
Carposina perileuca Lower, 1908
Carposina petraea Meyrick, 1910
=Carposina eulopha Turner, 1916
Carposina phycitana Walsingham, 1914
Carposina pinarodes Meyrick, 1910
Carposina piperatella Walsingham, 1907
Carposina plumbeonitida Walsingham, 1907
Carposina poliophara Bradley, 1965
Carposina proconsularis Meyrick, 1921
Carposina punctulata Walsingham, 1907
Carposina pusilla Walsingham, 1907
Carposina pygmaeella Walsingham, 1907
Carposina roesleri Amsel, 1977
Carposina rosella Kuznetsov, 1975
Carposina sasakii Matsumura, 1900
=Carposina nicholsana Forbes, 1923
=Carposina ottawana Kearfott, 1907
=Carposina niponensis Walsingham, 1900 (peach fruit moth)
=Carposina percicana Matsumura, 1899 (originally in Carpocapsa)
Carposina saurates Meyrick, 1913
Carposina scierotoxa Meyrick, 1924
Carposina scirrhosella Herrich-Schäffer, 1855
=Carposina orientella Staniou & Nemes, 1968
Carposina simulator Davis, 1969
Carposina siturga Meyrick, 1912
Carposina smaragdias Turner, 1916
Carposina socors Meyrick, 1928
Carposina solutella Walsingham, 1907
Carposina stationaria Meyrick, 1928
Carposina subolivacea Walsingham, 1907
Carposina subselliata Meyrick, 1921
Carposina subumbrata Walsingham, 1907
Carposina tanaoptera Turner, 1947
Carposina taractis Meyrick, 1910
Carposina telesia Meyrick, 1910
Carposina tetratoma Diakonoff, 1989
Carposina thermurga Meyrick, 1929
=Carposina ferruginea Meyrick, 1925
Carposina tincta Walsingham, 1907
Carposina togata Walsingham, 1907
Carposina trigononotata Walsingham, 1907
Carposina viduana Caradja, 1916
Carposina viridis Walsingham, 1907
Carposina zymota Meyrick, 1910 (originally in Meridarchis)

Former species
Carposina aplegia Turner, 1916
Carposina euryleuca Meyrick, 1912
=Carposina comonana Kearfott, 1907
Carposina sysciodes Turner, 1947

References

Natural History Museum Lepidoptera generic names catalog

Carposinidae
Moth genera